Pateley Bridge railway station is a disused railway station in North Yorkshire, England.

The station was the terminating station on the North Eastern Railway (NER) Nidd Valley branch line. The station opened in 1862 and had a single platform; a small goods yard and a small locomotive depot, comprising a shed and a railway turntable.

In 1907 a connection was opened from the station, across the main street in Pateley Bridge to link the Bradford Corporation owned Nidd Valley Light Railway (NVLR) with the NER branch line.  This connection was only used by goods traffic as the NVLR opened its own passenger station a few hundred metres away and passengers had to walk between the two stations.

The station was host to a camping coach in 1933 and 1935, possibly one for some of 1934 and two coaches from 1936 to 1939, the station was also used as an overnight stop for touring camping coach service in 1935.

All traffic on the NVLR ceased in 1936 and the Nidd Valley branch went into a decline which led to the withdrawal of passenger services in 1951 and the closure of the line and the station to all traffic in 1964.

The main station building at Pateley Bridge survived and is now in private use.

References
Notes

Sources
 
 
 
 
 

Disused railway stations in North Yorkshire
Former North Eastern Railway (UK) stations
Railway stations in Great Britain closed in 1951
Railway stations in Great Britain opened in 1862
1862 establishments in England
Pateley Bridge